Brephostoma carpenteri is a species of fish in the family Epigonidae, the deepwater cardinalfishes. This species is the only known member of its genus.

The species name honors Alfred Carpenter RN DSO (father of Vice-Admiral Alfred Francis Blakeney Carpenter, VC), who was in command of the ship carrying out the marine survey during which the type specimen was collected.

References

Epigonidae
Monotypic fish genera
Fish described in 1889